Emil Lyubchov Kostadinov (born 12 August 1967) is a Bulgarian former professional footballer who played as a forward and represented the Bulgaria national team at two World Cups.

Club career
Born in Sofia, Kostadinov started his career in CSKA Sofia. There he formed a redoubtable trio with Hristo Stoichkov and Luboslav Penev in the late 1980s, helping the team to win three times the Bulgarian Championship title, three times the Bulgarian Cup and reached the semi-final of the Cup Winners' Cup.

He played for FC Porto from 1990 to 1994, winning the Portuguese league twice, and becoming popular among Portuguese fans. He also played for Deportivo de La Coruña, Bayern Munich (winning the UEFA Cup with them in 1996 and scoring in the final itself), Fenerbahçe, Mainz 05, and UANL Tigres.

International career
Kostadinov played in the 1985 FIFA World Youth Championship scoring two goals. He was a member of the Bulgaria national team from 1988 to 1998. He earned 70 caps in which he scored 27 goals.

Kostadinov gained international prominence after scoring two goals in the last matchday of the European 1994 World Cup qualification, against the France national team. He scored his second goal in the last second of the match with a shot with his right foot from inside the French penalty area that sent the ball into the roof of the net. That match-winning goal enabled Bulgaria to qualify for the 1994 World Cup finals at the expense of France.

After helping Bulgaria qualify for the 1994 World Cup, he was a part of the squad that reached the semi-finals in the finals tournament, again in partnership with Hristo Stoichkov. He played all seven games but did not score. During the game against Italy in the semi-final, Kostadinov was fouled by Alessandro Costacurta in the penalty area, who later committed a handball offence there as well. Both actions were not given penalties, which sparked a lot of controversy, as Bulgarians accused the French referee Joel Quiniou of purposefully ignoring the situations to get "revenge" for the decisive qualifying game between Bulgaria and France at the Parc des Princes, which saw the former qualifying to the World Cup at the expense of the latter.

He also played at the Euro 96 and the 1998 World Cup, both tournaments in which Bulgaria did not reach the second round. He scored one (and actually the only) goal in the 1998 World Cup against Spain in the group stages. He retired before the qualifying campaign for EURO 2000.

International goals
Scores and results list Bulgaria's goal tally first, score column indicates score after each Kostadinov goal.

Honours
CSKA Sofia
Bulgarian A PFG: 1986–87, 1988–89, 1989–90
Bulgarian Cup: 1986–87, 1987–88, 1988–89
Bulgarian Supercup: 1989

Porto
Primeira Liga: 1991–92, 1992–93, 1994–95
Taça de Portugal: 1990–91, 1993–94
Supertaça Cândido de Oliveira: 1990, 1991, 1993, 1994

Bayern Munich
UEFA Cup: 1995–96

Bulgaria
FIFA World Cup: fourth place (bronze): 1994

References

External links

1967 births
Living people
Footballers from Sofia
Association football forwards
Bulgarian footballers
Bulgaria international footballers
Bulgaria youth international footballers
PFC CSKA Sofia players
FC Porto players
FC Bayern Munich footballers
1. FSV Mainz 05 players
Fenerbahçe S.K. footballers
Tigres UANL footballers
Deportivo de La Coruña players
First Professional Football League (Bulgaria) players
Bundesliga players
2. Bundesliga players
Primeira Liga players
La Liga players
Süper Lig players
Liga MX players
1994 FIFA World Cup players
1998 FIFA World Cup players
UEFA Euro 1996 players
Bulgarian expatriate footballers
Expatriate footballers in Portugal
Bulgarian expatriate sportspeople in Portugal
Expatriate footballers in Spain
Bulgarian expatriate sportspeople in Spain
Expatriate footballers in Germany
Bulgarian expatriate sportspeople in Germany
Expatriate footballers in Turkey
Bulgarian expatriate sportspeople in Turkey
Expatriate footballers in Mexico
UEFA Cup winning players